Wanxiong Shi (6 October 1963 - 30 September 2021) was a Chinese mathematician. He was known for his fundamental work in the theory of Ricci flow.

Education 
Shi was a native of Quanzhou, Fujian. In 1978, Shi graduated from Quanzhou No. 5 Middle School, and entered the University of Science and Technology of China. Shi earned his bachelor's degree in mathematics in 1982, then he went to the Institute of Mathematics of Chinese Academy of Sciences and obtained his master's degree in mathematics in 1985 under the guidance of Lu Qikeng and Zhong Jiaqing. Then Shi was recruited by Shing-Tung Yau to study under him at the University of California, San Diego. In 1987, Shi followed Yau to Harvard University and obtained his Ph.D. there in 1990.

Since Shi was stronger in geometric analysis than other Chinese students, having an impressive ability to carry out highly technical arguments, he was assigned by Yau to investigate Ricci flow in the challenging case of noncompact manifolds. Shi made significant breakthroughs and was highly regarded by researchers in the field. Richard Hamilton, the founder of Ricci flow theory, liked his work very much.

Academic career and later life 
Upon his graduation, several prominent universities were interested in offering him a faculty position. Hung-Hsi Wu from the University of California, Berkeley asked Yau if Shi could come to Berkeley. Without seeking opinion from Yau, Shi applied to and got tenure track assistant professorship offers from the University of California, San Diego, where Richard Hamilton was working at, and Purdue University.

Shi decided to join Purdue University. He published several important papers there, and was awarded three grants from the NSF in 1991, 1994 and 1997. However, Shi did not pass the tenure review in 1997, so he had to leave the university. (The principal investigator of the NSF grant of 1997 was changed because of this.) Yau believes that the failure was due to the faculty members not realising the importance of Ricci flow theory. Hamilton sent a belated reference letter to Purdue University in which he rebuked the decision, but to no avail.

Shi then left academia and moved to Washington D.C., where he lived a frugal and secluded life in solitude, and had less and less contact with his friends. He turned down some offers from other universities. Yau and former classmates of Shi tried to persuade Shi and help him return to academia, but he rejected. Yau felt sorry for Shi's leaving academia, since among the four students of Yau who worked on Ricci flow, Shi had done the best work. Shi died from a sudden heart attack in the evening of September 30, 2021.

Work 
Shi initiated the study of Ricci flow theory on noncompact complete manifolds. He proved local derivative estimates for the Ricci flow, which are fundamental to many arguments of the theory, including Perelman's proof of the Poincaré conjecture using Ricci flow in 2002.

Publications

References

External links 
 

20th-century Chinese mathematicians
Mathematicians from Fujian
Differential geometers
University of Science and Technology of China alumni
Harvard University alumni
Purdue University faculty